Drycothaea anteochracea is a species of beetle in the family Cerambycidae. It was described by Breuning in 1974. It is known from Brazil and French Guiana.

References

Calliini
Beetles described in 1974